Regarding biological membranes, the liquid ordered phase is a liquid crystalline phase of a lipid bilayer, and is of significant biological importance. It occurs in many lipid mixtures combining cholesterol with a phospholipid and/or sphingolipids e.g. sphingomyelin. This phase has been related to lipid rafts that may exist in plasma membranes.

Definition
The liquid ordered phase can be defined as:
 fluid and lamellar phase, including the Wide angle X-ray scattering pattern centered by broad diffraction peak at 4.2Å
 acyl hydrocarbon chains are in the all-trans state
 rapid lateral diffusion
 2H-NMR quadrupolar splitting is ca. 50 kHz

History
This was first called the liquid ordered phase by Ipsen et al. (1987). However, it has also been called the LGI subgel phase by Huang et al. (1993) and the β phase by Vist and Davis (1990).

References
 Ipsen, J. H., G. Karlstrom, O. G. Mouritsen, H. Wennerstrom, and M. J. Zuckermann. 1987. Phase equilibria in the phosphatidylcholine-cholesterol system. Biochim. Biophys. Acta. 905:162–172.
 Huang TH, Lee CWB, Dasgupta SK, Blume A, Griffin RG. 1993. "A C-13 and H-2 Nuclear-Magnetic-Resonance Study of Phosphatidylcholine Cholesterol Interactions - Characterization of Liquid-Gel Phases." Biochemistry 32(48):13277-13287
 Vist MR, Davis JH. 1990. "Phase-Equilibria of Cholesterol Dipalmitoylphosphatidylcholine Mixtures - H-2 Nuclear Magnetic-Resonance and Differential Scanning Calorimetry." Biochemistry 29(2):451-464.

Membrane biology
Liquid crystals